Uladzislau Novik (born 31 March 1995) is a Belarusian male track cyclist, representing Belarus at international competitions. He competed at the 2016 UEC European Track Championships in the team sprint event.

References

1995 births
Living people
Belarusian male cyclists
Belarusian track cyclists
Place of birth missing (living people)
Cyclists at the 2019 European Games
European Games competitors for Belarus